The 1976 Speedway World Pairs Championship was the seventh FIM Speedway World Pairs Championship. The final took place in Eskilstuna, Sweden. The championship was won by host England (27 points) who beat Denmark (24 points) and Sweden (22 points).

Semifinal 1
  Norden
 June 6

Semifinal 2
  Miskolc
 June 6

World final
  Eskilstuna, Eskilstuna Motorstadion
 June 17

See also
 1976 Individual Speedway World Championship
 1976 Speedway World Team Cup
 motorcycle speedway
 1976 in sports

References

1976
World Pairs